Lagoa Azul Lighthouse is a lighthouse located on the headland of Lagoa Azul in the district of Lobata, northern São Tomé Island, São Tomé and Príncipe. It is 4.5 km northwest of Guadalupe and 15 km northwest of the city of São Tomé. The lighthouse was built in 1997. It is a 5 m high white tower with red bands, and its focal height is 34 m.

See also

List of lighthouses in São Tomé and Príncipe

References

Lighthouses in São Tomé and Príncipe
Lobata District
Lighthouses completed in 1997